John A. Vasquez is an American political scientist and the Thomas B. Mackie Scholar in International Relations and Professor of Political Science at the University of Illinois at Urbana–Champaign. He is a former president of International Studies Association.

Books
 Vasquez, J. A. (2018). Contagion and War: Lessons from the First World War. Cambridge University Press. 
 Levy, J. S., & Vasquez, J. A. (Eds.) (2014). The Outbreak of the First World War: Structure, Politics, and Decision-Making. Cambridge University Press.
 Vasquez, J. A. (2009). The War Puzzle Revisited. (Cambridge Studies in International Relations). Cambridge University Press. 
 Senese, P. D., & Vasquez, J. A. (2008). The Steps to War: An Empirical Study. Princeton University Press. 
 Vasquez, J. A. (1999). The Power of Power Politics: From Classical Realism to Neotraditionalism. (Cambridge Studies in International Relations). Cambridge University Press

References

External links
Vasquez at Illinois

Living people
American political scientists
1945 births
University of Illinois Urbana-Champaign faculty
Boston University alumni
Syracuse University alumni
Peace and conflict scholars